The Futsal Championship of Kazakhstan is the premier  futsal league in Kazakhstan, organized by Football Federation of Kazakhstan.

Seasons summary

Teams 2015-2016
Kairat Almaty
Astana-Tulpar Karagandy
Ayat Rudny
Inzhu Aktobe
Ushkyn-Iskra Astana

External links
futsalplanet.com

Futsal competitions in Kazakhstan
futsal
Kazakhstan
1998 establishments in Kazakhstan
Sports leagues established in 1998